Mayfair, California may refer to:
 Mayfair, Fresno County, California
 Mayfair, Kern County, California